Daniela Petrescu (née Bran; born 13 April 1968) is a long-distance runner from Romania, who specializes mainly in the 3000 metres steeplechase. She is a former world record holder in this obstacle race, clocking 9:55.28 on 21 June 1998 in Bucharest.

References
1999 IAAF Year Ranking

1968 births
Living people
Romanian female long-distance runners
Romanian female steeplechase runners
World record setters in athletics (track and field)
Goodwill Games medalists in athletics
Competitors at the 1998 Goodwill Games